Patel Kirit Balubhai is an Indian politician from the Bharatiya Janata Party served as a member of the Gujarat Legislative Assembly from the Visavadar Assembly constituency from 2017 to 2022.

References

Living people
Indian politicians
Gujarat MLAs 2017–2022
Bharatiya Janata Party politicians from Gujarat
People from Junagadh district
Year of birth missing (living people)